Simon Snyder Rathvon (1812–1891) was an American entomologist. He specialized in economic and agricultural entomology.

Rathvon was from Lancaster, Pennsylvania and studied under naturalist Samuel S. Haldeman. He went on to become Professor of Entomology at the Pennsylvania Horticultural Society, editor of the agricultural periodical Lancaster Farmer, and contributed to reports published by the United States Department of Agriculture.

Biography
Rathvon was born on April 24, 1812 in Marietta, Pennsylvania. He apprenticed for a tailor in his teenage years, and by 1832, he opened his own shop in Marietta. He continued the trade for the rest of his career. Although he had an interest in farming, he did not consider himself to have the right build for the work.

In 1832, Rathvon joined the Marietta Thespian Society. Here he met Samuel S. Haldeman, who kindled Rathvon's interest in natural history. By 1842, entomology had become his primary focus. He published perhaps hundreds of papers on the subject, but the true amount is not known. He was only paid twice for these pursuits—for when he had authored two reports for the USDA in the 1860s. 

Rathvon was known for having a quiet, reserved disposition. He struggled with feelings of inadequacy within the scientific community, and felt that his lack of formal education made him unqualified. Despite this, Rathvon was an early advocate for applied agricultural entomology. He argued for using integrated pest and crop management techniques, emphasizing the importance of growers differentiating between beneficial, detrimental, and neutral insects. 

Later in his scientific career, Rathvon became Professor of Entomology at the Pennsylvania Horticultural Society and editor of the agricultural periodical Lancaster Farmer. In 1862, Rathvon helped found the Linnaean Society of Lancaster. In 1878, he was awarded an honorary Ph.D. from Franklin and Marshall College.

Partially deaf since his early 30s, his deafness became total in the 1880s. Rathvon died on March 19, 1891. Although it is stated that he was interred at Shreiner-Concord Cemetery, the exact site of his grave is unknown.

Legacy
Rathvon fathered 11 children with his wife Catharine Freyberger.

Rathvon had a large personal insect collection and purchased the collection of Haldeman. Through this purchase, he also acquired the collections of Nicholas Marcellus Hentz. The Rathvon collection numbered around 10,000 species by 1884. It was later purchased for donation to Franklin and Marshall College. Almost 6,000 of Rathvon's specimens are housed at the North Museum of Nature and Science in Lancaster. 

Rathvon is the namesake of several species, including Anatis rathvoni, Lichnanthe rathvoni, and Lytta rathvoni. The subspecies Nebria gebleri rathvoni was also named in his honor by John Lawrence LeConte.

References

American entomologists
1812 births
1891 deaths
People from Lancaster County, Pennsylvania
Botanists with author abbreviations